Cochimí was once the language of the greater part Baja California, as attested by Jesuit documents of the 18th century. It seems to have become extinct around the beginning of the 20th century (Modern "Cochimi"-speakers are actually speakers of Kumiai.) There were two main dialects, northern and southern; the dividing line was approximately at the Misión San Ignacio Kadakaamán, in the north of present-day Baja California Sur.

The Jesuit texts establish that the language was related to the Yuman languages of the Colorado River region. It is thought to be the most divergent language of the family, which is generally called Yuman–Cochimí to reflect this. Based on glottochronology studies, the separation between Cochimi and the Yuman languages is believed to have occurred about 1000 BC.

Cochimí text 
Following is the Lord's Prayer in the dialect of San Ignacio Kadakaamán, recorded by Francisco Javier Clavijero from the work of the missionaries Barco and Ventura, which has been lost.

Phonology
The phonology of the Cochimí language is likely explained as follows:

Consonants 

*-  could have been disputed.

Voiced consonants likely could have been either separate phonemes or phonetic alternates of voiceless sounds.

Vowels 

Mid vowels may be alternated with close vowel sounds.

References 

Yuman–Cochimí languages
Indigenous languages of Mexico
Languages attested from the 18th century
18th-century establishments in Alta California
Languages extinct in the 20th century
20th-century disestablishments in California